Antonio Manuel Fernández (January 17, 1902 – November 7, 1956) was a United States representative from New Mexico. He was born in Springer, New Mexico, where he attended the public schools, and Highlands University, Las Vegas, New Mexico. He received law training at Cumberland University, Lebanon, Tennessee, and was a court reporter for the eighth judicial district of New Mexico in 1925–1930. Later, he was admitted to the bar in 1931 and commenced practice in Raton, New Mexico. He was the assistant district attorney of the eighth judicial district in 1933 and practiced law in Santa Fe, New Mexico, in 1934.

Fernández served in the New Mexico House of Representatives in 1935. He was the chief tax attorney for the New Mexico Tax Commission in 1935 and 1936 and the first assistant attorney general in 1937–1941. He was a member of the first New Mexico Public Service Commission in 1941 and 1942 and was elected as a Democrat to the 78th and to the six succeeding Congresses and served from January 3, 1943, until his death. Fernández was the chairman, Committee on Memorials (Seventy-ninth Congress). He died after he had been reelected to the 85th congress in Albuquerque, New Mexico, on November 7, 1956, and was buried in Rosario Catholic Cemetery, Santa Fe, New Mexico.

See also  
 List of Hispanic and Latino Americans in the United States Congress
 List of United States Congress members who died in office (1950–99)

References 

1902 births
1956 deaths
Democratic Party members of the New Mexico House of Representatives
New Mexico lawyers
American politicians of Mexican descent
Hispanic and Latino American state legislators in New Mexico
Hispanic and Latino American members of the United States Congress
New Mexico Highlands University alumni
People from Springer, New Mexico
Democratic Party members of the United States House of Representatives from New Mexico
20th-century American lawyers
20th-century American politicians
People from Santa Fe, New Mexico
League of United Latin American Citizens activists